Kubutambahan is a district (kecamatan) in the regency of Buleleng Timur (east) in northern Bali (Province), Indonesia.

It contains a number of notable temples such as Pura Meduwe Karang which have been painted in recent years. 

Districts of Bali
Buleleng Regency